Haunted History is a 2013 American TV series featuring stories of supernatural experiences and why "haunted history" is attached to the most haunted locations in the United States. The series premiered on July 12, 2013.

Series Overview

Episode Guide

Season 1 (2013)

References

External links
Haunted History official website

American non-fiction television series
2013 American television series debuts
2013 American television series endings
History (American TV channel) original programming
Television series by Original Productions